Holy Trinity Orthodox Church is a historic church at 433 Long Street in Wilkeson, Washington. The church was founded by Eastern European Slavic immigrants from the Carpathian Mountains of eastern Czechoslovakia.

It was built in a Gothic Revival style and was added to the National Register in 1989.

References

Eastern Orthodox churches in Washington (state)
Churches on the National Register of Historic Places in Washington (state)
Carpenter Gothic church buildings in Washington (state)
Churches in Pierce County, Washington
Rusyn-American history
Slovak-American history
National Register of Historic Places in Tacoma, Washington